Robert "Bob" Stirrat was the Lead on the Findo Gask CC curling team (from Perth, Scotland) during the World Curling Championships known as the 1961 Scotch Cup, where Scottish team won silver medals. The team won The Rink Championship in 1961.

References

Possibly living people
Scottish male curlers
Year of birth missing